Burki or Bürki is a surname. Notable people with the surname include:

Arshad Iqbal Burki (born 1984), Pakistani squash player
Bruno Bürki (born 1931), Swiss pastor
Cornelia Bürki (born 1953), South African-Swiss Olympic runner
Daphné Bürki (born 1980), French television host and columnist
Gianna Hablützel-Bürki (born 1969), Swiss fencer
Jamshed Burki, Pakistani politician
Javed Burki (born 1938), Pakistani cricket player
Marco Bürki (born 1993), Swiss football player
Marie José Burki (born 1961), Swiss video artist and educator
Raymond Burki (1949-2016), Swiss cartoonist
Roman Bürki (born 1990), Swiss football player
Saleem Burki (born 1991), Pakistani cricket player
Sandro Burki (born 1985), Swiss football player
Shahid Javed Burki (born 1938), Pakistani economist
Vanessa Bürki (born 1986), Swiss football player
Wajid Ali Khan Burki (1900-1988), Pakistani army general

See also
Ormur, also known as Burki, a Pashtun tribe in Pakistan